The 1935 VFL Grand Final was an Australian rules football game contested between the Collingwood Football Club and South Melbourne Football Club, held at the Melbourne Cricket Ground in Melbourne on 5 October 1935. It was the 37th annual Grand Final of the Victorian Football League, staged to determine the premiers for the 1935 VFL season. The match, attended by 54,154 spectators, was won by Collingwood by a margin of 20 points, marking that club's tenth premiership victory.

On Grand Final eve, South Melbourne's champion full-forward Bob Pratt was hit by a brick truck when alighting from a tram. He was replaced at full-forward by Roy Moore. Neither Moore nor Laurie Nash at centre-half-forward were able to break free of their opponents (Charlie Dibbs and Jack Regan respectively), helping Collingwood to win the match.

Teams

 Umpire - Bob Scott

Statistics

Score

Goal kickers

References
 AFL Tables: 1935 Grand Final
 The Official statistical history of the AFL 2004
 Ross, J. (ed), 100 Years of Australian Football 1897-1996: The Complete Story of the AFL, All the Big Stories, All the Great Pictures, All the Champions, Every AFL Season Reported, Viking, (Ringwood), 1996.

See also

 1935 VFL season

VFL/AFL Grand Finals
Grand
Collingwood Football Club
Sydney Swans